Marietta Sirleaf,<ref name="birthplace">Retta. TV Guide’’. Retrieved 07-16-22.</ref> known professionally as Retta, is an American stand-up comedian and actress. She is best known for her roles of Donna Meagle on NBC's Parks and Recreation and Ruby Hill on NBC's Good Girls. She has appeared in several films and television shows, and has performed stand-up on Comedy Central's Premium Blend.

Early life and education
Retta was born in Newark, New Jersey. She is of Liberian descent. She grew up around New Jersey, specifically in Edison and Cliffwood Beach.

In 1988, Retta graduated from Matawan Regional High School in Aberdeen Township, New Jersey. In 1992, Retta graduated from Duke University in Durham, North Carolina, where she was pre-med and graduated with a degree in sociology.

Retta was raised as a member of the New Apostolic Church. In the youth group of her church, her ability to make others laugh was a major talent. When Retta competed in her first TV comedy contest, members from all over the world from the New Apostolic Church voted for her. This contributed to her winning the contest and helped to further her career. In that contest she mentioned her faith and spiritual upbringing.

Career
After graduating from Duke, Retta worked as a chemist. In her spare time, she did stand-up at Charlie Goodnights Comedy Club in Raleigh, North Carolina. Eventually, she moved to Los Angeles to pursue a career in comedy. Retta said on Wait Wait... Don't Tell Me! that when she started performing stand-up comedy, she decided to call herself Retta rather than explain her name. She started doing standup in 1996, although she said she did not start "earning money" until 1998, when she began touring on the college circuit. Retta said she used to get "really nauseated" before a performance, but that the feeling passed with experience. Retta has said her stand-up material tends to be slightly embellished stories from her regular everyday life, family, and friends.

Retta has served as the opening act for such comedians as Shirley Hemphill and Bobby Collins. She has made television appearances on Bravo's Welcome to the Parker, E! Entertainment Television's The Soup, Freddie, Moesha, It's Always Sunny in Philadelphia, the "Comedy Divas Showcase" segment of The Jenny Jones Show, Retta has performed on Premium Blend, a Comedy Central show featuring up-and-coming comedians.

In 2009, Retta started making regular guest appearances on the NBC comedy series Parks and Recreation as Donna Meagle, an employee in the Parks Department of the fictional town, Pawnee, Indiana. During a stand-up performance at the University of Illinois at Springfield, Retta said the acting job on the show was stressful because it was unclear how long the show would stay on the air, due to the poor reviews it received during the first season. Alan Sepinwall, a television columnist with The Star-Ledger, said season 2 episodes of Parks and Recreation afforded more personality and funnier jokes to Donna and other minor characters. She was upgraded to a full-time regular cast member in the third season.

Retta also hosted the 3rd Critics' Choice Television Awards in 2013. In 2014, she appeared on Hollywood Game Night as a contestant along with the other celebrities Paget Brewster, Michael Chiklis, Mario Lopez, Thomas Lennon, and Alyssa Milano.

In 2015, Retta was one of the audiobook narrators for Welcome to Night Vale, a novel tie-in to the eponymous podcast series in which she is the voice of Old Woman Josie. The same year she appeared in season 2 of Bravo's Girlfriends' Guide to Divorce.

In 2018, Retta co-starred in the NBC series, Good Girls, opposite Christina Hendricks and Mae Whitman.

In 2018, Retta published a series of essays in a book called So Close to Being the Sh*t, Y'all Don't Even Know. Where she talks about her journey with weight loss with "bestie" and the joys and adventures of being in the "Hollywood Scene!"

In 2022, Retta signed a talent holding deal with NBCUniversal.

In 2022, Retta hosted HGTV's Ugliest House in America season 1, 2, and 3

Personal life
On Wait Wait... Don't Tell Me!'', she said she dated a man from Georgia who nicknamed her Retta because that was what the name Marietta sounded like where he came from.

Retta is a niece by marriage of the former Liberian president Ellen Johnson Sirleaf.

Retta is a fan of the Los Angeles Kings hockey team, and presented awards at the NHL award ceremonies in Las Vegas, in 2014 and 2015.

Filmography

Film

Television

Works and publications

Notes

References

External links

 
 

1970 births
Actresses from New Jersey
African-American female comedians
African-American actresses
American film actresses
American people of Liberian descent
American stand-up comedians
American television actresses
American women comedians
Living people
Matawan Regional High School alumni
Duke University Trinity College of Arts and Sciences alumni
21st-century American actresses
21st-century American comedians
Shorty Award winners
21st-century African-American women
21st-century African-American people
20th-century African-American people
20th-century African-American women